is a Japanese voice actress and singer. She provides the voice of main character Ema Hinata in the anime Aikatsu Friends!. She released her first studio album Ai toka Kanjō in January 2020.

Filmography

Anime

Anime films

Discography

Studio albums

References

External links
 Official agency profile 
 Official blog 
 Yui Ninomiya at Lantis 

2001 births
Singers from Tokyo
Lantis (company) artists
Japanese voice actresses
Japanese child actresses
Japanese film actresses
Voice actresses from Tokyo
Actresses from Tokyo
Living people
21st-century Japanese women singers
21st-century Japanese singers
21st-century Japanese actresses
People from Kanagawa Prefecture
Horipro artists